The Black Curtain is a mystery novel written by Cornell Woolrich. The book was initially published in 1941 by Grosset & Dunlap.

Plot 
The story concerns a man with amnesia, named Frank Townsend. He cannot remember anything from the previous three years of his life. As it turns out, he may be a suspected murderer. He struggles to find a loophole in the overwhelming evidence.

Film and broadcast adaptations 
There has been one cinematic adaptation of the novel, one on radio, and one much later done for television
Street of Chance (1942) (movie), directed by Jack HivelySuspense, dramatic adaptation written by William Spier and featuring Robert Montgomery as the amnesiac (CBS Radio, 2 February 1943)
 The Alfred Hitchcock Hour'' – "The Black Curtain", directed by Sydney Pollack, broadcast November 15, 1962

References 

 

1941 American novels
Novels by Cornell Woolrich
Fiction about amnesia
American novels adapted into television shows